The 1979 Coupe de France Final was a football match held at Parc des Princes, Paris on 16 June 1979 that saw FC Nantes defeat AJ Auxerre of Division 2 4–1 thanks to goals by Eric Pécout and Oscar Muller.

Match details

See also
Coupe de France 1978-79

External links
Coupe de France results at Rec.Sport.Soccer Statistics Foundation
Report on French federation site

Coupe
1979
Coupe De France Final 1979
Coupe De France Final 1979
Coupe de France Final
Coupe de France Final